Paulo Ferreira de Camargo Filho (born 14 January 1940), known as Paulinho Ferreira, is a Brazilian former footballer who competed in the 1960 Summer Olympics.

References

1940 births
Living people
Association football forwards
Brazilian footballers
Olympic footballers of Brazil
Footballers at the 1960 Summer Olympics
Sociedade Esportiva Palmeiras players